"Big" Jim West (13 February 1954 – 20 December 2015) was an Australian professional fly/super fly/bantam/super bantam/feather/super feather/light/light welter/welterweight boxer of the 1970s and '80s who won the Australian flyweight title, New South Wales (Australia) State bantamweight title, Australian super featherweight title, and Commonwealth flyweight title, and was a challenger for the Australian bantamweight title against Brian Roberts, Australian lightweight title against Matt Ropis, Australian super featherweight title against Paul Ferreri, New South Wales (Australia) State lightweight title against Willie Tarika, and New South Wales (Australia) State light welterweight title against Gary Rosen, his professional fighting weight varied from , i.e. flyweight to , i.e. welterweight, he died in Sydney.

References

External links

1954 births
2015 deaths
Bantamweight boxers
Featherweight boxers
Flyweight boxers
Lightweight boxers
Light-welterweight boxers
Sportsmen from New South Wales
Super-bantamweight boxers
Super-featherweight boxers
Super-flyweight boxers
Welterweight boxers
Australian male boxers
Commonwealth Boxing Council champions